Kootenay Lake Provincial Park is a provincial park in British Columbia, Canada. It encompasses five widely dispersed parks around Kootenay Lake: Kootenay Lake Provincial Park (Davis Creek site), Kootenay Lake Provincial Park (Lost Ledge sites), Kootenay Lake Provincial Park (Midge Creek site), Kootenay Lake Provincial Park (Campbell Bay site), and Kootenay Lake Provincial Park (Coffee Creek site).

All of the parks are located in south central British Columbia.

Kootenay Lake Provincial Park (Davis Creek and Lost Ledge sites)
43 hectares.

Kootenay Lake Provincial Park (Midge Creek site) 
223 hectares.

Kootenay Lake Provincial Park (Campbell Bay site)
25 hectares.

Kootenay Lake Provincial Park (Coffee Creek site)
52 hectares.

References

External links
Kootenay Lake Provincial Park (Davis Creek and Lost Ledge sites)
Kootenay Lake Provincial Park (Midge Creek site)
Kootenay Lake Provincial Park (Campbell Bay site)
Kootenay Lake Provincial Park (Coffee Creek site)

Provincial parks of British Columbia
Regional District of Central Kootenay
Year of establishment missing